Hildegardia is a genus of trees in the family Malvaceae. In older systems of classification, it was placed in Sterculiaceae, but all members of that family are now in an expanded Malvaceae. The genus is named for Saint Hildegard of Bingen due to her contributions to herbal medicine. There are 13 species with a pantropical distribution.

Species include:
Hildegardia ankaranensis (Arènes) Kosterm.
Hildegardia australensis G.Leach & M.Cheek (1991)
Hildegardia barteri (Mast.) Kosterm.
Hildegardia cubensis (Urb.) Kosterm.  – Guana, guanabaum
Hildegardia dauphinensis
Hildegardia erythrosiphon (Baill.) Kosterm.
Hildegardia gillettii L.J.Dorr & L.C.Barnett (1990)
Hildegardia merrittii (Merrill) Kosterm.
Hildegardia migeodii (Exell) Kosterm.
Hildegardia perrieri (Hochr.) Arènes
Hildegardia populifolia
Hildegardia sundaica Kosterm.

References

Sterculioideae
Malvaceae genera
Taxonomy articles created by Polbot
Hildegard of Bingen